Rosquillos are Philippine cookies made from flour, eggs, shortening, sugar, and baking powder. They were originally created by Margarita “Titay” T. Frasco in 1907 in Liloan, Cebu. The name means "ringlet" in Spanish (from rosca, "ring") and was reputedly coined by Philippine President Sergio Osmeña.

Despite sharing the name, Philippine rosquillos are not related to the Spanish rosquillos (better known as rosquillas, roscos, or rosquillos de vino), which are more akin to baked doughnuts.

There are two notable variants of rosquillos, differing in shape. The first is galletas del Carmen, which is flower-shaped and does not have a hole in the center. The other is galletas de bato (lit. "stone [mill] cracker"), which has a hole in the center but does not have a crenelated edge.

See also
Roscas
Galletas de patatas
Galletas pesquera
Cuisine of the Philippines
Filipinos (snack food)

References

Philippine pastries